Leirvasshøi is a mountain in Skjåk Municipality in Innlandet county, Norway. The mountain is surrounded by several other notable mountains including Kvitlenova and Raudeggi to the north, Mårådalsfjellet and Skridulaupen to the northeast, Dyringshøi to the east, Søverhøi to the southeast, and Tverreggi to the south. The vast Jostedalsbreen glacier lies just to the southwest of this mountain.

See also
List of mountains of Norway

References

Skjåk
Mountains of Innlandet